Nick Keizer (born May 2, 1995) is a former American football tight end. He played college football at Grand Valley State.

Early years
Keizer was born to a family of Latvian descent, and grew up in Portage, Michigan. He attended Portage Northern High School where he played baseball and football. As a senior, he had 19 receptions for 353 yards and three touchdowns on offense and 28 tackles, 14.5 tackles for loss and two sacks on defense and was named Division 2 All-State and selected to play in Michigan's East-West All Star Game.

College career
Keizer was a member of the Grand Valley State Lakers, redshirting as a true freshman. As a redshirt senior, Keizer was named first-team All-Great Lakes Intercollegiate Athletic Conference (GLIAC) after leading tight ends in the conference with 29 receptions for 504 yards and nine touchdowns. Keizer finished his collegiate career with 45 receptions for 734 yards and 11 touchdown receptions.

Professional career

Baltimore Ravens
Keizer was signed by the Baltimore Ravens as an undrafted free agent in 2018. He was cut at the end of training camp but was re-signed to the team's practice squad. He signed a futures deal after the season, but was released.

Kansas City Chiefs
Keizer was signed by the Kansas City Chiefs on May 31, 2019. He was waived during final roster cuts, but was re-signed to the practice squad and remained there for the rest of the season. He signed a futures contract with the team on February 4, 2020 and made the team coming out of training camp in 2020. Keizer made his NFL debut in the season opener on September 10, 2020, against the Houston Texans, serving as the team's second tight end and making a tackle on special teams in a 34–20 win.

Keizer re-signed to a one-year contract with the Chiefs on March 23, 2021. He announced his retirement on August 8, 2021.

References

External links

 Grand Valley State Lakers profile
 Kansas City Chiefs profile

1995 births
Living people
American people of Latvian descent
Players of American football from Michigan
American football tight ends
Grand Valley State Lakers football players
Kansas City Chiefs players
Baltimore Ravens players